Acaulospora delicata is a species of fungus in the family Acaulosporaceae. It forms arbuscular mycorrhiza and vesicles in roots. Discovered growing in a pot culture with Sorghum sudanense, the fungus was described as new to science in 1986.

References

Diversisporales
Fungi described in 1986
Fungi of Arizona
Fungi without expected TNC conservation status